Tip clearance is the distance between the tip of a rotating airfoil and a stationary part. 
 Gas turbine: Rotor blade and casing

 Propeller (ship or aircraft): Propeller and structure
 Ground tip clearance 
 Wind turbine: blade and tower

References

Mechanical engineering